Abdul Injai or Abdoul Ndaiye was a Senegalese mercenary in colonial Portuguese Guinea at the turn of the 20th century. 

A Muslim Wolof, Abdul Injai initially came to notice while assisting in the punitive military missions of Portuguese colonialists Oliveira Musanty and Teixeira Pinto, from 1905 to 1915. This era was the beginning of a Portuguese campaign against the animist tribes of the interior, with the help of the indigenous coastal Islamic population. It would not be until 1936 that areas like the Bijagos Islands would be under complete government control. Tedious alliances, like those between Abdul Injai and the Portuguese during the Scramble for Africa, reflect the overwhelming tendency for European colonial powers to attempt to divide native African populations based on religious affiliations - particularly the idea that, although racially inferior to Europeans, Muslim Africans possessed higher levels of education and culture and were preferential associates compared to followers of animist or tribal religions.

Notes

People of French West Africa
Wolof people
Senegalese mercenaries
Year of birth missing
Year of death missing
Senegalese Muslims
Senegalese military personnel
Portuguese military personnel